On November 2, 2004, the District of Columbia held a U.S. House of Representatives election for its shadow representative. Unlike its non-voting delegate, the shadow representative is only recognized by the district and is not officially sworn or seated. This race was a rematch of 2002 when the same two candidates appeared on the ballot. Like in 2002, incumbent Shadow Representative Ray Browne was reelected.

Primary elections
Primary elections were held on September 14.

Democratic primary

Candidates
 Susana Baranano, candidate for Shadow Representative in 2002
 Ray Browne, incumbent Shadow Representative

Results

Other primaries
A Republican primary was held but no candidates filed and only write-in votes were cast. Adam Eidinger was the only Statehood-Green candidate and got 90% of the vote.

General election
The general election took place on November 2, 2004. It was an exact rematch of the election two years before.

Results

References

Washington, D.C., Shadow Representative elections
2004 elections in Washington, D.C.